2015 Lunar New Year Cup, also known as the Lunar New Year AET Cup 2015 due to sponsorship reason, is the annual football event held in Hong Kong to celebrate the Chinese New Year. South China of Hong Kong Premier League were authorised by the Hong Kong Football Association to hold the 2015 event; and New York Cosmos of North American Soccer League were invited to participate. It was the first time an American football team had joined this event. The football march between these two teams was played in Hong Kong Stadium on 20 January 2015, the Chinese New Year Day. The Cup was won by New York Cosmos after a penalty shootout.

Teams
There were two teams participated in the 2015 Lunar New Year Cup. Former Real Madrid striker Raul made his debut appearance for New York Cosmos in the match.

Squads

South China

New York Cosmos

Fixtures and results

References

Lunar New Year Cup
Lunar